

Geographical locations 
Judaean Desert
Judaean Mountains

States, autonomous regions 
Judea
Jewish Autonomous Oblast
State of Israel
Yehud Medinata

Districts 
Judea and Samaria Area
Judenburg District

Towns 

al-Yahudiya
Evraiomnimata
Judenau-Baumgarten
Judenbach
Jüdenberg
Judenburg 
Tedef
Yehud

Villages
Castrillo Matajudíos
Jodensavanne
La Mort aux Juifs

Street names 
Frankfurter Judengasse
Jodenbreestraat
Jüdenstraße (Berlin-Mitte)
Old Jewry

Sites 
Jewry Wall
Jewish Quarter (Jerusalem)
Jewish quarter (diaspora)

Jew